Poleá or "pulley" (in Spanish: poleá) is a typical recipe of Andalusian cuisine, particularly the provinces of Seville, Huelva, and Cádiz. It is a variant of porridge typical of those consumed in hard times (it was a common dish during the Spanish Civil War). The dish is made with water, flour, salt, anise, milk, and sugar. Other ingredients (such as fruit, honey, anisette, cinnamon, or Galium aparine (cleavers)) are sometimes added. It is usually served with croutons of fried bread.

See also
Gachas

References

Andalusian cuisine
Spanish desserts
Porridges